GNT is a Brazilian pay television channel. Originally launched as GNT: Globosat News Television,  a news and information network. With the launch of GloboNews, in 1996, the GNT acronym became meaningless, and the channel was focused on documentaries and talk shows. In 2003, the channel was once again repositioned, with increased female-oriented programming, such as successful talk show Saia Justa. However, some original GNT programs remain, such as Manhattan Connection, currently the longest-running original program on Brazilian subscription television, though that program moved to GloboNews in January 2011.

Programming

Original programming
 Pirei com Betty Lago
 Decora
 Diário de uma Vegana
 Alternativa: Saúde
 Chagadas e Partidas
 Base Aliada
 Vamos Combinar
 Diário do Olivier
 Food Truck - A Batalha
 GNT Fashion
 Duas Histéricas
 Descontroladas
 Marília Gabriela Entrevista
 Que Marravilha!
 Perdas e Ganhos
 Saia Justa
 Mãe & Cia.
 Conversa de Salão
 Detox do Amor
 Superbonita
 Pirei
 Santa Ajuda
 Por Um Fio
 Nos Trinques
 No Astral
 Dilemas de Irene

Acquired programming

Original

Acquired

Sports Events

Soccer

Tennis

Basketball

Slogans

 (2003-2006) - "Você vive este canal". (You live this channel.)
 (2006-2010) - "Você vê a diferença". (You see the difference.)
 (2010-2011) - "É pra você". (It's for you.)
 (2011-2015) - "Com você". (With you.)
 (2015–present) - "Para todos os gostos, um único GNT." (For every taste, only one GNT.) / "Para todos os estilos, um único GNT." (For every style, only one GNT.) / "Para todas as emoções, um único GNT." (For every mood, only one GNT.) / "Para todos os momentos, um único GNT." (For every moment, only one GNT.)

References

External links
 GNT official website

Television networks in Brazil
Television stations in Brazil
Globosat
Portuguese-language television networks
Companies based in Rio de Janeiro (state)
Television channels and stations established in 1991
1991 establishments in Brazil